Galvin is an unincorporated community in Lewis County, Washington, United States, near Lincoln Creek and the Chehalis River.  The town is four miles (6.4 km) northwest of Centralia.

Galvin was platted on June 3, 1910 as a logging settlement. Originally named Lincoln, it was renamed in the next year for John Galvin, its founder. The city is noted for the Busek Auto Museum, a collection of a variety of vintage vehicles, which was featured in a 2007 independent film, Rain in the Mountains.

References

Populated places in Lewis County, Washington
Unincorporated communities in Lewis County, Washington
Unincorporated communities in Washington (state)